Aftab-e Yazd (آفتاب یزد lit. "The Yazd Sun") is a Persian-language daily reformist newspaper published in Tehran, Iran. The title of the paper means “the sun of Yazd” in Persian.

History and profile
Aftab Yazd was started in August 2000. The paper, based in Tehran, is affiliated with the Association of Combatant Clerics (of which former President Mohammad Khatami is a leading member). The paper focuses on political, cultural, social and economic news.

In June 2005, before the 2005 presidential election, the paper along with another one, Eqbal, published the letter of presidential candidate Mahdi Karroubi to Supreme Leader Ali Khamenei. Upon this publication both papers were banned for one day by Tehran Public and Revolutionary Court. The daily was also temporarily ceased in June 2009 following the presidential elections. In December 2009 it was again warned by the ministry of culture for publishing "divisive" material.

See also
List of newspapers in Iran

References

External links
 
 

2000 establishments in Iran
Newspapers established in 2000
Newspapers published in Tehran
Persian-language newspapers